Demons and Wonders (original title: Demônios e Maravilhas) is a 1987 Brazilian autobiographical documentary film by and about Brazilian filmmaker, director, screenwriter, film and television actor and media personality José Mojica Marins. Marins is also known by his alter ego Zé do Caixão (in English, Coffin Joe). In the film Marins focuses on himself in scenes recounting life and experiences in filmmaking, with much focus on Marins' many battles with Brazilian film censors.

Marins began filming a second installment of the film called Alucinação Macabra (Macabre Hallucination), which consisted of scenes from his films mixed with video segments. Although all filming was completed, the film was never edited or released due to finances.

Cast
Carmem Marins
Elza Leonetti do Amaral
Francisco Cavalcanti
Jofre Soares
José Mojica Marins	(as himself)
Lírio Bertelli
Nilcemar Leyart
Pelé
Satã
Sílvio Santos

See also
Damned – The Strange World of José Mojica Marins

References

External links
Official filmsite

Demônios e Maravilhas at Portal Heco de Cinema 
Official José Mojica Marins website 

1987 films
Brazilian documentary films
1980s Portuguese-language films
Autobiographical documentary films
1987 documentary films
Films directed by José Mojica Marins